Here Comes Trouble may refer to:

Here Comes Trouble (Scatterbrain album) (1990)
Here Comes Trouble (Bad Company album) (1992)
Here Comes Trouble (The Eyeliners album) (2000)
Here Comes Trouble (Ian McLagan album) (2005)
Here Comes Trouble (1936 film), starring Paul Kelly, Arline Judge, and Mona Barrie
Here Comes Trouble (1948 film), a comedy featuring Dodo Doubleday
Here Comes Trouble: Stories from My Life, 2011 book by Michael Moore